Pedro Vázquez Llenin (born 6 August 1996) is a Spanish sprint canoeist.

He won a medal at the 2019 ICF Canoe Sprint World Championships.

References

External links

1996 births
Living people
ICF Canoe Sprint World Championships medalists in kayak
Spanish male canoeists
21st-century Spanish people